Palimphyes is an extinct genus of prehistoric euzaphlegid bony fish related to the escolars and snake mackerels.  The various species lived as deepwater mesopelagic predators in the Tethys and Paratethys oceans, with fossils of ten species found in Paleocene to Oligocene strata of the Swiss Alps, the Carpathian and Caucasus Mountains, Iran, India, and Turkmenistan.

See also

 Prehistoric fish
 List of prehistoric bony fish

References

Euzaphlegidae
Paleocene fish
Eocene fish
Oligocene fish
Oligocene genus extinctions
Fossils of Iran
Fossils of India
Thanetian genus first appearances